In geometry, the small icosacronic hexecontahedron (or small lanceal trisicosahedron) is a nonconvex isohedral polyhedron. It is the dual of the uniform small icosicosidodecahedron. Its faces are kites. Part of each kite lies inside the solid, hence is invisible in solid models.

Proportions

The dihedral angle equals .

References

External links
 

Dual uniform polyhedra